John Eardley Wilmot (1748 – 23 June 1815) was a British lawyer and politician who sat in the House of Commons from 1776 to 1796.

Early life
The younger son of Sir John Eardley Wilmot, Chief Justice of the Common Pleas, Wilmot was born at Derby in 1748, and was educated at Westminster School and Oxford, where he went on to become a fellow of All Souls. He studied for the church under Dr William Warburton, but afterwards decided to pursue the law instead and was called to the Bar, which his father called "quitting a bed of roses for a crown o' thorns."

Career
In 1776, about five years after his call to the bar, Wilmot was returned to parliament for Tiverton in Devon; and, taking part with the opposition, attacked the ministerial party in a pamphlet, denouncing the continuance of the American Revolutionary War. In 1781, he was appointed a master in Chancery; and, in 1782, was commissioned, in conjunction with others, to inquire into the distribution of the sums destined for the relief of the American loyalists. In the following year, he spoke on the subject in parliament; and, in reply to Charles James Fox's condemnation of the large sums expended on the American sufferers, he declared "he would share with them his last shilling and his last loaf." In 1784 he was a member of the St. Alban's Tavern group who tried to bring Fox and Pitt together.

In 1784, and the parliament which followed in 1790, Wilmot sat as member for Coventry, and supported the views of Pitt during every session. He was hostile to the French revolution and obtained the distribution of a fund, under the sanction of parliament, on behalf of the emigrants from that country. He was the author of A Treatise on the Laws and Customs of England. The other member for Coventry was his brother-in-law Sir Sampson Gideon, who in 1789 changed his name to Sampson Eardley.

In November, 1779 he was elected a Fellow of the Royal Society

Private life
In 1804, Wilmot retired from public life and devoted himself to writing. He published a Life of his father and another of Bishop Hough. In the year of his death, 1815, An Historical Review of the Commission relative to the American Loyalists appeared.

He lived at Berkswell Hall and was also the last private resident of Bruce Castle. In 1813 he was lord of the manor of the Prebend of Calne.

He was reported to be a man of upright and unimpeachable character, learned and eloquent. He was twice married. His first wife was the only daughter of S. Sainthell, Esq., by whom he had one son, Sir John Eardley-Wilmot, 1st Baronet, and four daughters. He married secondly, in 1793, Miss Hastam, by whom he had two further children who both died young.

Publications
John Eardley Wilmot, A Treatise on the Laws and Customs of England
John Eardley Wilmot, Memoirs of the life of the Right Honourable Sir John Eardley Wilmot (1802, 2nd edition 1811)
John Eardley Wilmot, The Life of the Rev. John Hough, D.D. (1812)
John Eardley Wilmot, An Historical Review of the Commission relative to the American Loyalists (1815)

References

External links 
Eardley-Wilmot Correspondence. Osborn Collection, Beinecke Rare Book and Manuscript Library, Yale University.

1748 births
1815 deaths
Politicians from Derby
People educated at Westminster School, London
Fellows of All Souls College, Oxford
Members of the Parliament of Great Britain for English constituencies
Fellows of the Royal Society
Members of Parliament for Coventry